The 1860 United States House of Representatives election in Florida was held on Monday, October 1, 1860 to elect the single United States Representative from the state of Florida, one from the state's single at-large congressional district, to represent Florida in the 37th Congress. The election coincided with the elections of other offices, including the presidential election, gubernatorial election, and various state and local elections.

The winning candidate would serve a two-year term in the United States House of Representatives from March 4, 1861, to March 4, 1863.

Hilton was never seated in Congress, however, as Florida had seceded from the Union before his term began.

Candidates

Democratic

Nominee 

 Robert Benjamin Hilton, clerk of the Florida House of Representatives

Eliminated at party convention 

 William Dilworth, former state representative
James Gettis, former state representative
 Barton C. Pope, former state representative
 J. Carraway Smith, former state representative
 Frederick L. Villepigue, secretary of state of Florida
 C. C. Younge, lawyer

Opposition

Nominee 

 Benjamin F. Allen, former state representative

Campaign
By 1860, the secession of the South from the Union was nearly inevitable. Both Hilton and Allen were secessionists; the only question that remained was what ideology would an independent Florida prefer: the conservatism of the Democratic Party or the Whiggism of the Opposition Party. Due to Hilton's close ties with Vice President John C. Breckinridge, the Democratic nominee for president, it was all but guaranteed that he would ride on Breckinridge's coattails.

Hilton soundly defeated Allen in the general election, receiving 60% of the vote to Allen's 40%.

General election

Results

Results by County

Aftermath
Florida seceded from the Union on January 10, 1861, meaning Hilton was not able to take his seat in Congress. However, Hilton won election to the Confederate States House of Representatives later in 1861, representing Florida's 2nd congressional district.

See also
1860 United States presidential election in Florida
United States House of Representatives elections, 1860
1860 Florida Gubernatorial election
1861 Confederate States House of Representatives elections in Florida

References

1852
Florida
United States House of Representatives